Charlyn is a given name. Notable people with this name include the following:

Charlyn Corral (born 1991), Mexican footballer
Charlyn Marie Marshall, known by her stage name Cat Power, (born 1972), American singer-songwriter

See also

Charlin (name)
Charly (name)
Charlyne